Scandium(III) oxide or scandia is a inorganic compound with formula Sc2O3.  It is one of several oxides of rare earth elements with a high melting point. It is used in the preparation of other scandium compounds as well as in high-temperature systems (for its resistance to heat and thermal shock), electronic ceramics, and glass composition (as a helper material).

Structure and physical properties
Scandium(III) oxide adopts a cubic crystal structure (point group: tetrahedral (Th), space group: Ia) containing 6-coordinate metal centres. Powder diffraction analysis shows Sc−O bond distances of 2.159–2.071 Å.

Scandium oxide is an insulator with a band gap of 6.0 eV.

Production
Scandium oxide is the primary form of refined scandium produced by the mining industry. Scandium-rich ores, such as thortveitite (Sc,Y)2(Si2O7) and kolbeckite ScPO4·2H2O are rare, however trace amounts of scandium are present in many other minerals. Scandium oxide is therefore predominantly produced as a by-product from the extraction of other elements.

Reactions
Scandium oxide is the primary form of refined scandium produced by the mining industry, making it the start point for all scandium chemistry.

Scandium oxide reacts with most acids upon heating, to produce the expected hydrated product. For example, heating in excess aqueous HCl produces hydrated ScCl3·nH2O. This can be rendered anhydrous by evaporation to dryness in the presence of NH4Cl, with the mixture then being purified by removal of NH4Cl by sublimation at 300-500 °C. The presence of NH4Cl is required, as the hydrated ScCl3·nH2O would otherwise form a mixed oxychloride upon drying.
 
Sc2O3 + 6 HCl + x H2O → 2 ScCl3·nH2O + 3 H2O
ScCl3·nH2O + n NH4Cl → ScCl3 + n H2O + n NH4Cl

Likewise, it is converted into hydrated scandium(III) triflate (Sc(OTf)3·nH2O) by a reaction with triflic acid.

Metallic scandium is produced industrially by the reduction of scandium oxide; this proceeds via conversion to scandium fluoride followed by a reduction with metallic calcium. This process is in some ways similar to the Kroll process for the production of metallic titanium.

Scandium oxide forms scandate salts with alkalis, unlike its higher homologues yttrium oxide and lanthanum oxide (but like lutetium oxide), for example forming K3Sc(OH)6 with KOH. In this, scandium oxide shows more similarity with aluminium oxide.

Natural occurrence
Natural scandia, although impure, occurs as mineral kangite.

References

Scandium compounds
Sesquioxides
Transition metal oxides